GES International Limited  is an engineering and manufacturing company founded as a sole proprietorship called Goh Electronics Services by Goh Lik Tuan in 1975. It is based in Singapore, Malaysia, China and the United States.  It is on the SGX, the Singapore stock exchange, and it is a listed component of the Straits Times Index. In 2006, it became a subsidiary of the Singapore-based Venture Corporation.

GES has two R&D (Research and Design) centers, in Singapore and Shanghai working in original design manufacturer (ODM) and original equipment manufacturer (OEM).

GES International performs manufacture and design including ASIC design, hardware design, software design, mechanical design, power management design, technical writing, PCB design, industrial design, etc. in the field of electronics.  The company began as a personal computer manufacturer in Asia, manufacturing the Datamini computer.

GES performs shipping (logistics) and aftermarket services, consisting of repair and warranty services.

References

Engineering companies of Singapore
Technology companies established in 1975
Singaporean companies established in 1975